Dahek - A Burning Passion is a 1999 Indian Hindi-language romance film directed by Lateef Binni. The film stars Akshaye Khanna and Sonali Bendre. The film deals with love between a Hindu boy and a Muslim girl.

Plot
Jabbar Bahkshi is the eldest son in the Bahkshi household in modern-day Bombay, India, and rules the entire family with an conservative iron hand. He finds out his sister, Sabina Bahkshi, is having an affair with Iqbal, and is angered because Sabina is not permitted to have an affair. Sabina and Iqbal elope and get married, and decide to stay away from the Bahkshi family. Jabbar hunts them down and kills Iqbal with a sword. Shocked at this brutality at the hands of her brother, Sabina stabs herself with the same sword and dies instantly. Jabbar is arrested by the Bombay Police, and is sentenced to twelve years in prison. His mother is devastated at Sabina's death and decides never to forgive him. After twelve years, Jabbar returns home and finds that his past rules are not being observed, and quickly re-asserts his authority, while his mother refuses to have to do anything with him. Jabbar meets his niece, Neelima Bahkshi, and is shocked to find her the very image of Sabina. He finds out that Neelima is having an affair with a young man, but Neelima, out of fear, denies this. She is indeed having an affair with young Sameer Roshan, and both are in love with each other. When they find out what happened to her aunt, they decide to run away from Bombay and Jabbar. When Jabbar learns of this he is angered, and his anger turns to blind rage when he finds out that Sameer is a Hindu, and he swears to kill them both. The news gets out of a Hindu boy and a Muslim girl eloping, and spreads like wildfire, arousing old flames, and creating a growing rift between the Hindus and the Muslims. Extreme elements on both the Hindu and the Muslim sides decide to get involved, and Jabbar decides that he will hunt them and kill them, and if necessary let history repeat itself.

Cast
Akshaye Khanna as Sameer B.Roshan
Sonali Bendre as  Sabina Bahkshi / Neelima Bahkshi 
Danny Dengzongpa as Jabbar Bahkshi
Dalip Tahil as Bhushan Roshan, Sameer's father
Anang Desai as Javed Bahkshi, Neelima's father
Achala Sachdev as Mrs. Bahkshi
Anjana Mumtaz as Mrs. Roshan
Achyut Potdar as Hindu Leader
Anil Nagrath
K.K.Raina as Naseem Bahkshi
Himani Shivpuri as Mrs. Javed Bahkshi
Tiku Talsania as Wedding guest
Sharad Kapoor as cameo

Music
"Sawan Barse Tarse Dil" - Sadhana Sargam, Hariharan
"Jab Se Tumhe Maine Dekha Sanam" - Udit Narayan, Anuradha Paudwal
"Kahaa Kare Koi Churaa Liyaa Dil Ko" - Udit Narayan, Sadhana Sargam
"Tujhe Dekhte Hi Ye Dil Kho Gaya Hai" - Alka Yagnik, Kumar Sanu
"Meri Jaan Hai Tu" - Alka Yagnik
"Aaluvaa Aalovaa, Ho Gori Aajaa Mere Dil Men" - Alka Yagnik, Sunidhi Chauhan, Udit Narayan, Vinod Rathod
"Meri Jaan Hai Tu (Male)" - Roop Kumar Rathod

References

External links

1999 films
1990s Hindi-language films
Indian romantic musical films
Indian interfaith romance films
Films scored by Aadesh Shrivastava
Films scored by Anand–Milind